Michał Żurawski is a Polish theater, film, television, radio and dubbing actor. Brother of the actor Piotr Żurawski.

Selected filmography

References

External links
 

Living people
1979 births
Polish film actors
Polish male actors
Polish male voice actors
Polish male radio actors
Polish male stage actors
Polish television actors
Polish people of Tatar descent
Polish people of Jewish descent
Aleksander Zelwerowicz National Academy of Dramatic Art in Warsaw alumni